The Visigothic Code (or Book of the Judgements;), also called Lex Visigothorum (English: Law of the Visigoths), is a set of laws first promulgated by king Chindasuinth (642–653 AD) of the Visigothic Kingdom in his second year of rule (642–643) that survives only in fragments. In 654 his son, king Recceswinth (649–672), published the enlarged law code, which was the first law code that applied equally to the conquering Goths and the general population, of which the majority had Roman roots, and had lived under Roman laws.

The code abolished the old tradition of having different laws for Romans (leges romanae) and Visigoths (leges barbarorum), and under it all the subjects of the Visigothic kingdom would stop being romani and gothi instead becoming hispani. In this way, all subjects of the kingdom were gathered under the same jurisdiction, eliminating social and legal differences, and allowing greater assimilation of the populations. As such, the Code marks the transition from the Roman law to Germanic law and is one of the best surviving examples of leges barbarorum. It combines elements of the Roman law, Catholic law and Germanic tribal customary law.

The first law codes
During the first centuries of Visigothic rule, Romans were ruled by different laws than Goths were. The earliest known Visigothic laws are the Code of Euric, which were compiled by roughly 480 A.D. The first written laws of the Visigothic kingdom were compiled during the rule of king Alaric II and were meant to regulate the lives of Romans, who made up the majority of the kingdom and were based on the existing Roman imperial laws and their interpretations. The Breviarium (Breviary of Alaric) was promulgated during the meeting of Visigothic nobles in Toulouse on February 2, 506.

During the reign of king Leovigild an attempt was made to unite the laws regulating the lives of Goths and Romans into a revised law code, Codex Revisus. In 589, at the Third Council of Toledo, the ruling Visigoths and Suebi, who had been Arian Christians, accepted Roman Christianity (what became modern Catholicism). Now that the formerly Roman population and the Goths shared the same faith King Reccared issued laws that equally applied to both populations.

Visigothic code

The code of 654 was enlarged by the novel legislation of Recceswinth (for which reason it is sometimes called the Code of Recceswinth) and later kings Wamba, Erwig, Egica, and perhaps Wittiza. Recceswinth's code was edited by Braulio of Zaragoza, since Chindasuinth's original code had been hastily written and promulgated.

During the Twelfth Council of Toledo in 681, King Erwig asked that the law code be clarified and revised. Some new laws were added, out of which 28 dealt with Jews.

The laws were far-reaching and long in effect: in 10th-century Galicia, monastic charters make reference to the Code. The laws govern and sanction family life and by extension political life: marriage, the transmission of property to heirs, safeguarding the rights of widows and orphans. Particularly with the Visigoth's Law Codes, women could inherit land and title, were allowed to manage land independently from their husbands or male relations, dispose of their property in legal wills if they had no heirs, could represent themselves and bear witness in court by age 14 and arrange for their own marriages by age 20.

The laws combined the Catholic Church's Canon law, and as such have a strongly theocratic tone.

The code is known to have been preserved by the Moors, as Christians were permitted the use of their own laws, where they did not conflict with those of the conquerors, upon the regular payment of jizya tribute. Thus it may be presumed that it was the recognized legal authority of Christian magistrates while the Iberian Peninsula remained under Muslim control. When Ferdinand III of Castile took Córdoba in the thirteenth century, he ordered that the code be adopted and observed by his subjects, and had it translated, albeit inaccurately, into the Spanish language, as the Fuero Juzgo. The Occitan language translation of this document, Llibre Jutge, is among the oldest literary texts in that language (c. 1050). In 1910 an English translation of the code by Samuel Parsons Scott was published, but it received severe criticism.

Contents
The following is a list of the books and titles which form the Visigothic Code.
Book I: Concerning Legal Agencies
Title I: The Lawmaker
Title II: The Law
Book II: Concerning the Conduct of Causes
Title I: Concerning Judges, and Matters to be Decided in Court
Title II: Concerning Causes
Title III: Concerning Constituents and Commissions
Title IV: Concerning Witnesses and Evidence
Title V: Concerning Valid and Invalid Documents and How Wills Should be Drawn Up
Book III: Concerning Marriage
Title I: Concerning Nuptial Contracts
Title II: Concerning Unlawful Marriages
Title III: Concerning the Rape of Virgins, or Widows
Title IV: Concerning Adultery
Title V: Concerning Incest, Apostasy, and Pederasty
Title VI: Concerning Divorce, and the Separation of Persons who have been Betrothed
Book IV: Concerning Natural Lineage
Title I: Concerning the Degrees of Relationship
Title II: Concerning the Laws of Inheritance
Title III: Concerning Wards and Their Guardians
Title IV: Concerning Foundlings
Title V: Concerning Such Property as is Vested by the Laws of Nature
Book V: Concerning Business Transactions
Title I: Ecclesiastical Affairs
Title II: Concerning Donations in General
Title III: Concerning the Gifts of Patrons
Title IV: Concerning Exchanges and Sales
Title V: Concerning Property Committed to the Charge of, or Loaned to, Another
Title VI: Concerning Pledges and Debts
Title VII: Concerning the Liberation of Slaves, and Freedmen
Book VI: Concerning Crimes and Tortures
Title I: Concerning the Accusers of Criminals
Title II: Concerning Malefactors and their Advisors, and Poisoners
Title III: Concerning Abortion
Title IV: Concerning Injuries, Wounds, and Mutilations, Inflicted upon Men
Title V: Concerning Homicide
Book VII: Concerning Theft and Fraud
Title I: Concerning Informers of Theft
Title II: Concerning Thieves and Stolen Property
Title III: Concerning Appropriators and Kidnappers of Slaves
Title IV: Concerning Custody and Sentencing
Title V: Concerning Forgers of Documents
Title VI: Concerning Counterfeiters of Metals
Book VIII: Concerning Acts of Violence and Injuries
Title I: Concerning Attacks, and Plunder of Property
Title II: Concerning Arson and Incendiaries
Title III: Concerning injuries to Trees, Gardens, or Growing Crops of any Description
Title IV: Concerning Injury to Animals, and Other Property
Title V: Concerning the Pasturage of Hogs and Concerning Strays
Title VI: Concerning Bees, and the Damage They Cause
Book IX: Concerning Fugitives and Refugees
Title I: Concerning Fugitives, and Those who Conceal, and Assist Them in Their Flight
Title II: Concerning Those who Refuse to go to War, and Deserters
Title III: Concerning Those who Seek Sanctuary in a Church
Book X: Concerning Partition, Limitation, and Boundaries
Title I: Concerning Partition, and Lands Conveyed by Contract
Title II: Concerning the Limitations of Fifty and Thirty Years
Title III: Concerning Boundaries and Landmarks
Book XI: Concerning the Sick and the Dead and Merchants who Come from Beyond
Title I: Concerning Physicians and Sick Persons
Title II: Concerning Those who Disturb Sepulchres
Title III: Concerning Merchants who Come from Beyond Seas
Book XII: Concerning the Prevention of Official Oppression, and the Thorough Extinction of Heretical Sects
Title I: Concerning the Exercise of Moderation in Judicial Decisions, and the Avoiding of Oppression by Those Invested with Authority
Title II: Concerning the Eradication of the Errors of all Heretics and Jews
Title III: Concerning New Laws against the Jews, in which Old Ones are Confirmed, and New Ones are Added

See also
Code of Euric
Early Germanic law
Fuero Juzgo
Salic law
Code (law)

Notes

Sources
King, P. D. "King Chindasvind and the First Territorial Law-code of the Visiogothic Kingdom." Visigothic Spain: New Approaches. ed. Edward James. Oxford: Clarendon Press, 1980. pp 131–157.

External links
Lex Visigothorum - Latin text
Visigothic Code - Forum Iudicum. 1908 English Translation of Full Text by Samuel Parsons Scott
R. A. Fletcher, 1984. Saint James's Catapult: The Life and Times of Diego Gelmírez of Santiago de Compostela (Oxford University Press) (on-line text)
 Information on the Visigothic Code as part of the leges Visigothorum and its manuscript tradition on the  website, A database on Carolingian secular law texts (Karl Ubl, Cologne University, Germany, 2012).
Visigothic Symposia 1 'Law and Theology' - New research on the Visigothic Code

Germanic legal codes
Legal history of Spain
Visigothic Kingdom